San Luis District is one of sixteen districts of the province Cañete in Peru.

San Luis has boundaries to the north with Cerro Azul, to the south with San Vicente, to the west with the Pacific Ocean and to the east with Quilmana. San Luis has a distinctive black population. The Afro-Peruvian styles evolved from the music of the African slaves brought by the Spaniards toAfro-Peruvian Dancers Peru during the early 17th century. Today Peru’s black population is still concentrated in the coastal region where their ancestors first labored in the sugar cane and cotton plantations. As a result, the hotbed for Afro-Peruvian music is the small coastal town of San Luis. This is home to the styles known as festejo, lando and toro mata. The government of Peru declared the town of San Luis - known for its vibrant Afro-Peruvian culture - a «Living Repository for Peru's Collective Memory».

References